Norman McNicol Davison (17 February 1888 – 20 December 1958) was an Australian rules footballer who played with Geelong in the Victorian Football League (VFL).

Notes

External links 

1888 births
1958 deaths
Australian rules footballers from Victoria (Australia)
Geelong Football Club players
People educated at Geelong Grammar School